The Cueva de Don Justo (or Cave of Don Justo) is one of approximately 70 caves and volcanic galleries on the island of El Hierro in the Canaries. 

It is the longest of 28 known lava tubes on El Hierro, and the 3rd longest lava tube in the Canary Islands, and the 13th longest in the world.

The cave contains well developed troglobitic fauna including seven species of troglobitic fauna exclusively found in this cave. The Cave is gated to protect these species, and is closed for tourists.

References

El Hierro
Don Justo
Don Justo
Volcanism of the Canary Islands